Creativity is a website that covers the creative aspects of advertising and design. Creativity started as a printed magazine in 1986 but moved online in 2009. 

The website aims to showcase ideas across all areas of consumer culture, explore the talent and techniques behind the work, and provide insight on the people and the trends shaping brand creativity. Creativity’s target audience includes advertising agency creatives, producers, directors, designers, editors, visual effects artists, advertisers, and others affiliated with marketing, advertising, design, and entertainment.

Creativity is part of Crain Communications, a privately held publisher of more than 30 trade titles.

History of AdCritic.com 
Founded in 1999, AdCritic.com was a pioneer in providing free downloadable video, specifically television commercials. It built a library of thousands of videos and was extremely popular. Unfortunately, the cost of the bandwidth was too high, and the site shut off access to all videos in December 2001. The following notice was posted on the site at that time:

AdCritic.com has enjoyed a successful life as a leader in the area of archiving television and radio advertising and related information for both consumers and the advertising industry. Our business, although strong, has been unable to weather the current economic realities besieging the United States today. The short answer: we became so popular so fast that we couldn't stay afloat!

The site was acquired by Ad Age Group in March 2002, at which time it changed to a subscription-only service bundled with Creativity magazine. In August 2007, the site was relaunched as Creativity Online.

References

External links
 Official website

Online magazines published in the United States
Defunct magazines published in the United States
Magazines established in 1986
Magazines disestablished in 2009
Online advertising
Professional and trade magazines
Online magazines with defunct print editions
Monthly magazines published in the United States